= Star Company Basketball Cards =

Star Company Basketball Cards (1983-1986) were the only licensed NBA basketball cards being produced during the mid-1980s. Occupying a place vacated by sports card giant Topps, which ended its contractual relationship with the NBA and its Players Association in 1982, Star purchased the official NBA license and began producing its colorful cards in mid-1983 with a 32 card All-Star set featuring stars from around the league who participated in the 1983 All-Star Game.

Star Company produced cards in limited quantities, with most production runs at or below 5,000 cards. Some card sets were made even more scarce by problems with quality control, particularly in the inaugural base set of 275 cards issued in 1983–84. Several of the teams in that set, most notably the Boston Celtics and Dallas Mavericks, saw less than twenty-five percent of their printed product (<1,000 cards) reach the market due to problems with ink saturation and miscutting of the cards.

Star cards were unlike any cards previously produced covering the NBA. They were sold in hobby shops by team in sealed, transparent plastic bags, known to many as "polybags." Cards were made available nationally through a small network of a half dozen so-called master distributors although some parts of the mid-west and various southern states received little attention among the distributor network. Many cards were initially purchased in response to ads in sports card magazines and even at various sporting events, including minor league baseball and hockey games. To this day, these cards are difficult to find due to the small print runs and non-standard distribution methods. These factors are also among the reasons the hobby does not view Star cards as traditional "rookie" cards, but instead considers them "extended rookies" or licensed cards published chronologically before a player's recognized rookie card. The 1986 Fleer set, published after most Star Company sets, arguably remains the set viewed by most as listing the official rookie cards of many of the 1980s great players.

Authentication of these cards, a longtime problem for collectors as a result of issues with counterfeiting, has been massively bolstered by the 2023 decision from industry leader Professional Sports Authenticator (PSA) to grade and authenticate the majority of the Star catalogue. In turn, vintage hobbyists are increasingly recognizing the legitimacy and historical significance of these cards, due in part to the increase of information about the catalog of original cards and the efforts of grading companies like PSA, Beckett and other industry leaders.

The Star Company catalog contains some of the most valuable basketball cards of the modern era. A 1984 Star #101 Michael Jordan card graded BGS 9 realized $387,484 to headline the Memory Lane Inc. Winter Rarities 2026 Auction, setting a record price for the issue in that grade. The price more than tripled the old record for a BGS 9, set in November 2024. A factory-sealed 1984 Star Bulls team set including Jordan realized $98,245.

Less than four months after a PSA 9 of Michael Jordan's 1984-85 Star #101 card sold for $925,000 in May of 2024, the record was topped with a private sale confirmed to eclipse the $1,000,000 threshold.

There are three Star base sets:

1983-84: 275 cards

1984-85: 288 cards

1985-86: 172 cards

There are 43 Star subsets:

ALL-STAR SETS: 2 (1983, 1984)

SPECIAL ALL-STAR SETS: 3 (1984 Denver Police, 1985 Crunch N'Munch, 1985 Star Lite)

SLAM DUNK CONTEST SETS: 2 (1983-84, 1985 Gatorade)

ALL-ROOKIES SETS: 2 (1983-84, 1985-86)

SUPER 5x7 SETS: 9 (1984-85 Court Kings, 1984-85 Slam Dunk, 1985 Boston Celtics, 1985 Chicago Bulls, 1985 Detroit Pistons, 1985 Houston Rockets, 1985 Los Angeles Lakers, 1985 Milwaukee Bucks, 1985 Philadelphia 76ers)

FRANZ BREAD PORTLAND TRAIL BLAZERS SETS: 2 (1984-85, 1985-86)

LIFEBUOY TEAM SETS: 2 (1986 Milwaukee Bucks, 1986 New Jersey Nets)

ARENA TEAM SETS: 6 (1984-85 Philadelphia 76ers, 1984-85 Los Angeles Lakers, 1984-85 Boston Celtics, 1984-85 Dallas Mavericks, 1984-85 Milwaukee Bucks, 1984-85 Milwaukee Bucks Game Night)

SPECIAL ISSUE SETS: 7 (1984-85 Award Banquet, 1985 Schick Legends, 1985 Head Coaches, 1985 Last 11 ROY, 1986 Court Kings, 1986 Best of the Best, 1986 Best of the New/Old)

PLAYER SETS-5 (1984 Larry Bird, 1984 Julius Erving, 1985 Kareem Abdul-Jabbar, 1986 Michael Jordan, 1986 Magic Johnson)

CHAMPIONS SETS-3 (1983-84 Philadelphia 76ers, 1984-85 Boston Celtics, 1985-86 Los Angeles Lakers)
